O-I Glass, Inc. is an American company that specializes in container glass products. It is one of the world's leading manufacturers of packaging products, holding the position of largest manufacturer of glass containers in North America, South America, Asia-Pacific and Europe (after acquiring BSN Glasspack in 2004). Approximately one of every two glass containers made worldwide is made by O-I, its affiliates, or its licensees.

Company 

While legally known as Owens-Illinois, Inc., the company changed its trade name to O-I in 2005 to group its global operations under a single, cross-language and cross-culture brand name.

The company's headquarters were previously located in One SeaGate, Toledo, Ohio, a local landmark. The headquarters were moved in late 2006 to the Levis Commons complex in Perrysburg, Ohio. The company is the successor to the Owens Bottle Company founded in 1903 by Michael Joseph Owens, who made the first automated bottle-making machine, and Edward Drummond Libbey. In 1929, the Owens Bottle Company merged with Illinois Glass Company to become Owens-Illinois, Inc. Six years later, Owens-Illinois merged with Corning Incorporated to form Owens Corning.

In 1971 Owens-Illinois produced an early commercial plasma display, the digivue.

Until July 2007, the company was also a worldwide manufacturer of plastics packaging with operations in North America, South America, Asia-Pacific and Europe. Plastics packaging products manufactured by O-I included containers, closures, and prescription containers. In July 2007 O-I completed the sale of its entire plastics packaging business to Rexam PLC, a UK listed packaging manufacturer.

Owens-Illinois was a part of the Dow Jones Industrial Average from June 1, 1959, until March 12, 1987. The company was added to the S&P 500 Index in January 2009. Owens-Illinois was one of the original S&P 500 companies in 1957. It was removed in 1987 (after purchase by Kohlberg Kravis Roberts), added in 1991 and removed again in 2000.

In October 2010, Owens-Illinois Venezuela C.A was expropriated by President Hugo Chávez.

In May 2015, O-I made an offer to purchase the food and beverage glass container business of Mexican company Vitro for $2.15 billion. The acquisition closed in September 2015.

In 2020, a subsidiary of O-I Glass, Paddock Enterprises, entered bankruptcy following numerous asbestos lawsuits filed against the company. All of the company’s asbestos-related claims were isolated within Paddock and separated from O-I's glass-making operations.

Partnership with NEG
Owens-Illinois partnered with NEG (Nippon Electric Glass), to produce glass television screens at its Columbus, Ohio, and Pittston, Pennsylvania, plants in the 1970s through the mid-1990s before allowing Techneglas to take over the operations.

Environmental issues

Although it has not made asbestos-containing materials since 1958, Owens-Illinois invented, tested, manufactured and distributed KAYLO asbestos containing thermal pipe insulation from 1948 through 1958. Owens-Illinois remains a named defendant in numerous asbestos litigation matters throughout the U.S. Some claims in these cases allege that Owens-Illinois was a participant in the seventh annual Saranac Seminar when the cancer-causing potential of asbestos was studied in the 1950s.

See also

In-mould labelling
Glass container production
Glass

References

External links
 

 O-I trademarks seen on their vintage glass containers

Glassmaking companies of the United States
Asbestos
Manufacturing companies based in Ohio
Companies based in Toledo, Ohio
Wood County, Ohio
American companies established in 1929
Manufacturing companies established in 1929
1929 establishments in Ohio
Companies listed on the New York Stock Exchange
Former components of the Dow Jones Industrial Average
Packaging companies of the United States
1987 mergers and acquisitions
Perrysburg, Ohio